Bezirk Klagenfurt-Land is a district of the state of 
Carinthia in Austria.

Municipalities

Towns (Städte) are indicated in boldface; market towns (Marktgemeinden) in italics; suburbs, hamlets and other subdivisions of a municipality are indicated in small characters. The point represents the administrative seat, Klagenfurt, but this statutory city doesn't belong to the district.
Ebenthal (Slov.: Žrelec)  (2)
Aich an der Straße, Berg, Ebenthal, Goritschach, Gradnitz, Gurnitz, Haber, Hinterberg, Kohldorf, Kosasmojach, Kossiach, Kreuth, Lipizach, Mieger, Moosberg, Niederdorf, Obermieger, Obitschach, Pfaffendorf, Priedl, Radsberg, Rain, Reichersdorf, Rosenegg, Rottenstein, Saager, Sabuatach, Schwarz, Tutzach, Untermieger, Werouzach, Zell, Zetterei, Zwanzgerberg
Feistritz im Rosental (Slov.: Bistrica v Rožu)  (3)
Bärental, Feistritz im Rosental, Hundsdorf, Matschach, Rabenberg, St. Johann im Rosental, Suetschach, Weizelsdorf, Ladinach, Polana, Sala
Ferlach (Slov.: Borovlje)  (1)
Babniak, Bodental, Dörfl, Dornach, Ferlach, Glainach, Görtschach, Jaklin, Kappel an der Drau, Kirschentheuer, Laak, Laiplach, Loibltal, Otrouza, Rauth, Reßnig, Seidolach, Singerberg, Strau, Strugarjach, Tratten, Unterbergen, Unterferlach, Unterglainach, Unterloibl, Waidisch, Windisch Bleiberg
Grafenstein (Slov.: Grabštajn)  (4)
Aich, Althofen, Dolina, Froschendorf, Grafenstein, Gumisch, Haidach, Hum, Klein Venedig, Lind, Münzendorf, Oberfischern, Oberwuchel, Pakein, Pirk, Replach, Saager, Sabuatach, Sand, Schloss Rain, Schulterndorf, Skarbin, St. Peter, Tainacherfeld, Thon, Truttendorf, Unterfischern, Unterwuchel, Werda, Wölfnitz, Zapfendorf
Keutschach am See (Slov.: Hodiše)  (7)
Dobein, Dobeinitz, Höflein, Höhe, Keutschach, Leisbach, Linden, Pertitschach, Plaschischen, Plescherken, Rauth, Reauz, Schelesnitz, St. Margarethen, St. Nikolai
Köttmannsdorf (Slov.: Kotmara vas)  (8)
Aich, Am Teller, Gaisach, Göriach, Hollenburg, Köttmannsdorf, Lambichl, Mostitz, Neusaß, Plöschenberg, Preliebl, Rotschitzen, Schwanein, St. Gandolf, St. Margarethen, Thal, Trabesing, Tretram, Tschachoritsch, Tschrestal, Unterschloßberg, Wegscheide, Wurdach
Krumpendorf (Slov.: Kriva Vrba)  (9)
Görtschach, Krumpendorf, Nußberg, Pritschitz, Tultschnig
Ludmannsdorf (Slov.: Bilčovs)  (10)
Bach, Edling, Fellersdorf, Franzendorf, Großkleinberg, Ludmannsdorf, Lukowitz, Moschenitzen, Muschkau, Niederdörfl, Oberdörfl, Pugrad, Rupertiberg, Selkach, Strein, Wellersdorf, Zedras
Magdalensberg (Slov.: Štalenska Gora) (11)
Christofberg, Deinsdorf, Dürnfeld, Eibelhof, Eixendorf, Farchern, Freudenberg, Gammersdorf, Geiersdorf, Göriach, Gottesbichl, Großgörtschach, Gundersdorf, Haag, Hollern, Kleingörtschach, Kreuzbichl, Kronabeth, Lassendorf, Latschach, Leibnitz, Magdalensberg, Matzendorf, Ottmanach, Pirk, Pischeldorf, Portendorf, Reigersdorf, Schöpfendorf, Sillebrücke, St. Lorenzen, St. Martin, St. Thomas, Stuttern, Timenitz, Treffelsdorf, Vellach, Wutschein, Zeiselberg, Zinsdorf
Maria Rain (Slov.: Žihpolje)  (12)
Angern, Angersbichl, Ehrensdorf, Göltschach, Haimach, Maria Rain, Nadram, Oberguntschach, Obertöllern, Saberda, St. Ulrich, Stemeritsch, Strantschitschach, Toppelsdorf, Tschedram, Unterguntschach, Untertöllern
Maria Saal (Slov.: Gospa Sveta) (5)
Arndorf, Bergl, Dellach, Gröblach, Hart, Höfern, Judendorf, Kading, Karnburg, Kuchling, Lind, Maria Saal, Meilsberg, Meiselberg, Möderndorf, Poppichl, Poppichl, Pörtschach am Berg, Possau, Prikalitz, Ratzendorf, Rosendorf, Rotheis, Sagrad, St. Michael am Zollfeld, Stegendorf, Stuttern, Techmannsdorf, Thurn, Töltschach, Treffelsdorf, Walddorf, Willersdorf, Winklern, Wrießnitz, Wutschein, Zell, Zollfeld
Maria Wörth (Slov.: Otok)  (13)
Maiernigg, Maria Wörth, Oberdellach, Raunach, Reifnitz, Sekirn, St. Anna, Unterdellach
Moosburg (Slov.: Možberk)  (6)
Ameisbichl, Arlsdorf, Bärndorf, Dellach, Faning, Freudenberg, Gabriel, Goritschitzen, Gradenegg, Hohenfeld, Knasweg, Knasweg, Krainig, Kreggab, Malleberg, Moosburg, Nußberg, Obergöriach, Polan, Prosintschach, Ratzenegg, Rosenau, Seigbichl, Simislau, St. Peter, Stallhofen, Tigring, Tuderschitz, Untergöriach, Unterlinden, Vögelitz, Wielen, Windischbach, Windischbach-Gegend, Witsch, Witsch, Ziegelsdorf
Poggersdorf (Slov.: Pokrče)  (14)
Ameisbichl, Annamischl, Eibelhof, Eiersdorf, Erlach, Goritschach, Haidach, Kreuth, Kreuzergegend, Krobathen, Lanzendorf, Leibsdorf, Linsenberg, Pischeldorf, Poggersdorf, Pubersdorf, Rain, Raunachmoos, St. Johann, St. Michael ob der Gurk, Ströglach, Wabelsdorf, Wirtschach
Pörtschach am Wörthersee (Slov.: Poreče ob Vrbskem jezeru) (15)
Sankt Margareten im Rosental (Slov.: Šmarjeta v Rožu) (16)
Dobrowa, Dullach, Gotschuchen, Gupf, Hintergupf, Homölisch, Niederdörfl, Oberdörfl, Sabosach, Seel, St. Margareten im Rosental, Trieblach
Schiefling am See (Slov.: Škofiče) (17)
Aich, Albersdorf, Auen, Farrendorf, Goritschach, Ottosch, Penken, Raunach, Roach, Roda, Schiefling, St. Kathrein, Techelweg, Zauchen
Techelsberg (Slov.: Teholica)  (18)
Arndorf, Ebenfeld, Greilitz, Hadanig, Karl, Pavor, Pernach, Saag, Schwarzendorf, Sekull, St. Bartlmä, St. Martin am Techelsberg, Tibitsch, Töpriach, Töschling, Trabenig, Trieblach
Zell (Slov.: Sele) (19)
Zell-Freibach, Zell-Homölisch, Zell-Koschuta, Zell-Mitterwinkel, Zell-Oberwinkel, Zell-Pfarre, Zell-Schaida

Notes and references

 
Districts of Carinthia (state)